The Escambia County School District (ECSD) is the organization responsible for the administration of public schools in all of Escambia County, Florida, in the United States. The district currently administers 35 elementary schools, nine middle schools, and seven high schools, as well as a number of specialized centers.
The district is administered by an appointed superintendent and a five-member school board. The superintendent of schools is Timothy Smith, who replaced Malcolm Thomas. Thomas served an initial four-year term that began November 18, 2008, and was re-elected in 2012 and 2016. The Escambia County electors voted in November 2018, to switch from an elected superintendent to an appointed superintendent. Prior to 2020, the superintendent was elected in presidential election years. The deputy superintendent of schools is Shenna Payne, a former principal of West Florida High School.

Board
The members of the school board are:
 District 1 - Kevin Adams 
 District 2 -  Paul H. Fetsko  (chair)
 District 3 - David Williams
 District 4 - Patty Hightower (vice chair)
 District 5 - Bill Slayton 

Members are elected in their respective districts for a four-year term. Representatives from districts 1, 2, and 3 are elected in non-presidential election years. Representatives for districts 4 and 5 are elected in presidential election years. Although elected by districts, each member is charged by statute with representing the entire school district.

Because the school board elections are non-partisan, these races are frequently decided in the primary election. If a candidate gets a majority of the vote in the primary, he or she wins, and the race is not on the general election ballot in November. If no candidate has a majority of the vote, the top two are in a run-off on the November ballot.

The school board appointed Tim Smith as superintendent. Smith was sworn in on November 17, 2020, replacing Malcolm Thomas, whose term ended.

Schools

Adult Centers
Dixon Educational Center
George Stone Technical Center

High schools
Escambia High School (Gator)
Northview High School (Chief)
Pensacola High School (Tiger)
Pine Forest High School (Eagle)
J. M. Tate High School (Aggie)
Booker T. Washington High School (Wildcat)
West Florida High School of Advanced Technology (Jaguar)

Middle schools
Bellview Middle School
Beulah Academy of Science (Charter)
Beulah Middle School
Brown-Barge Middle School
Ernest Ward Middle School
Ferry Pass Middle School
Jim C. Bailey Middle School
Ransom Middle School
Warrington Middle School
Workman Middle School

Closed
Woodham Middle School, formerly Woodham High School, was converted to a middle school following the 2006–07 school year. Closed the summer after the 2017-18 school year and began renovations to be converted into the new West Florida High School of Advanced Technology campus.
Wedgewood Middle School
Brentwood Middle School
Brownsville Middle School

2007 Changes
Effective for the 2007–08 school year, Wedgewood Middle School and Brentwood Middle School students were transferred to Woodham High School, now Woodham Middle School. Brownsville Middle School students were transferred to Warrington Middle School, Brown Barge Middle School students were transferred into the Brentwood Middle School building, and Brownsville, Brentwood, and Wedgewood schools were closed.

2018 Changes
Effective for the 2018-19 school year, Woodham Middle School students were transferred to Ferry Pass Middle School, Workman Middle School, Warrington Middle School, and Beulah Middle School. This was in preparation for Woodham's former campus to be refitted into a new campus for West Florida High School of Advanced Technology.

Elementary schools

A.K. Suter Elementary School
Bellview Elementary School
Beulah Elementary School
Blue Angels Elementary School
Bratt Elementary School
C.A. Weis Elementary Community School
Cordova Park Elementary School
Ensley Elementary School
Ferry Pass Elementary School
Global Learning Academy
Hellen Caro Elementary School
Holm Elementary School
Jim Allen Elementary School
Kingsfield Elementary School (opened August 2018)
Lincoln Park Elementary School
Lipscomb Elementary School
Longleaf Elementary School
McArthur Elementary School
Molino Park Elementary School
Montclair Elementary School
Myrtle Grove Elementary School
N.B. Cook Elementary School
Navy Point Elementary School
O.J. Semmes Elementary School
Oakcrest Elementary School
Pine Meadow Elementary School
Pleasant Grove Elementary School
R.C. Lipscomb Elementary School
Scenic Heights Elementary SChool
Sherwood Elementary School
Warrington Elementary School
West Pensacola Elementary School

Pensacola Beach Elementary School, which became a charter school in 2001, is a part of the ECSD.

Alternative Schools
 Escambia Virtual Academy (Virtual School)

Failing schools
The Florida Comprehensive Assessment Test (FCAT) determines which schools in the state of Florida should be considered "Failing." The Florida Standards Assessments (FSA) began phasing out the FCAT in the 2010–11 academic year in response to the inauguration of the Common Core State Standards Initiative under the administration of US President Barack Obama in 2010.

FCAT and FSA scores are calculated per subject on a 0 to 100 scale, and ratings in the 0 to 20 or 20 to 40 range are rated "F" or "D" respectively, indicating severe performance shortcomings and contributing to a 2 and 3-year process respectively of "restarting" the school.

In the 2017–18 school year, Escambia County placed as 52nd of 64 counties in the state by FSA performance, with eleven of thirty-five elementary schools receiving a D rating and three of ten middle schools receiving a D rating. No high school performed at a rating of D or below, though Escambia High School and Ferry Pass Middle School both recorded an "I," or Incomplete rating for the 2017-18 school year.

See also

References

External links
Escambia County School District

 
School districts in Florida
Education in Escambia County, Florida